General Horn may refer to:

Arvid Horn (1664–1742), Swedish general
Gustav Evertsson Horn (1614–1666), Swedish general
Henrik Horn (1618–1693), Swedish lieutenant general
Tiemann Newell Horn (1868–1923), U.S. Army brigadier general

See also
Carl von Horn (1847–1923), Bavarian colonel general
Carl von Horn (1903–1989), Swedish Army major general
Henry Horne, 1st Baron Horne (1861–1929), British Army general